Skyuka Spring is a spring in the U.S. state of Georgia.

Skyuka Spring was named after Skyuka/Wyuca, a Cherokee chieftain.

References

Rivers of Georgia (U.S. state)
Rivers of Dade County, Georgia